Quinto Elemento (Portuguese for "Fifth Element") is the second studio album by Brazilian rock band Zero. Their first proper studio release in 20 years since Carne Humana in 1987, it was independently-released on August 30, 2007. The band has uploaded early versions of each of the album's songs on their official Myspace as teasers.

The tracks "Em Volta do Sol", "Mentiras" and "Dedicatória" were re-recorded from their 2000 compilation Electro-Acústico.

Track listing

Personnel
 Guilherme Isnard – vocals
 Vitor Vidaut – drums
 Yan França – guitar
 Jorge Pescara – bass
 João Paulo "JP" Mendonça, Nilo Romero – production
 Eduardo Rocha – cover art

References

External links
 Quinto Elemento at Discogs

2007 albums
Zero (Brazilian band) albums